Weer en Verkeer (in English Weather and Traffic Channel) was a television channel in the Netherlands broadcasting weather forecasts, weather-related news and traffic information. The forecasts and traffic reports were provided by a major Dutch meteorological company Meteo Consult in Wageningen which also provides the weather forecasts for RTL 4. Weer en Verkeer has been a joint venture between Meteo Consult and Chello Benelux (Liberty Global).

History
The channel was launched on 15 February 2006 under the name Weerkanaal (Weather Channel).

In December 2008, the channel got its current name.

The channel closed on 1 October 2013.

References

External links
Official Site

Defunct television channels in the Netherlands
Liberty Global
Television channels and stations established in 2006
Television channels and stations disestablished in 2013
2006 establishments in the Netherlands